ACTA2 (actin alpha 2) is an actin protein with several aliases including alpha-actin, alpha-actin-2, aortic smooth muscle or alpha smooth muscle actin (α-SMA, SMactin, alpha-SM-actin, ASMA). Actins are a family of globular multi-functional proteins that form microfilaments. ACTA2 is one of 6 different actin isoforms and is involved in the contractile apparatus of smooth muscle. ACTA2 (as with all the actins) is extremely highly conserved and found in nearly all mammals.

In humans, ACTA2 is encoded by the ACTA2 gene located on 10q22-q24. Mutations in this gene cause a variety of vascular diseases, such as thoracic aortic disease, coronary artery disease, stroke, Moyamoya disease, and multisystemic smooth muscle dysfunction syndrome.

ACTA2 (commonly referred to as alpha-smooth muscle actin or α-SMA) is often used as a marker of myofibroblast formation.   Studies have shown that ACTA2 is associated with TGF β pathway that enhances contractile properties of Hepatic Stellate Cells leading to liver fibrosis and cirrhosis.

References

Further reading

External links 
  GeneReviews/NIH/NCBI/UW entry on Thoracic Aortic Aneurysms and Aortic Dissections
 

Human proteins